Chris Kutalik is a Texas-based journalist and game designer serving as Communications Director for the Democratic Socialists of America, the largest socialist organization in the United States. He previously served as the Texas statewide coordinator for Our Revolution. Until 2009, Kutalik was the managing editor of Labor Notes, the largest circulation cross-union national publication remaining in the United States. He has served as an editor and writer for several independent media publications. Before joining Labor Notes' staff, Kutalik had been a local union officer for Amalgamated Transit Union Local 1549 in Austin, Texas and a copy editor at the online news service Stratfor.

His writing has appeared in the print and online versions of the Detroit News, Metro Times, Z Magazine, CounterPunch, Monthly Review, Against the Current, Canadian Dimension, and in numerous union publications.  Kutalik has appeared as a guest reporter on Democracy Now!.

Kutalik collaborated in the writing and editing of A Troublemakers' Handbook 2.

References 

Writers from Austin, Texas
American male journalists
Living people
Year of birth missing (living people)